Fulton is a census-designated place (CDP) in Sonoma County, California, United States. Fulton has a post office, established in 1871 and assigned ZIP code 95439. The community is named after Thomas and James Fulton, who founded the community. The population as of the 2010 U.S. Census was 541. There are a set of railway lines which go through the town boundaries; these lines are used by Sonoma–Marin Area Rail Transit (or the SMART Train). Fulton was once home to a chicken processing plant that was in operation from the 1960s until its closure in 2010.

History

The community is named after Thomas and James Fulton, who founded the community.

Geography

Climate
This region experiences warm (but not hot) and dry summers, with no average monthly temperatures above .  According to the Köppen Climate Classification system, Fulton has a warm-summer Mediterranean climate, abbreviated "Csb" on climate maps.

Demographics

The 2010 United States Census reported that Fulton had a population of 541. The racial makeup of Fulton was 349 (64.5%) White, 3 (0.6%) African American, 12 (2.2%) Native American, 11 (2.0%) Asian, 1 (0.2%) Pacific Islander, 149 (27.5%) from other races, and 16 (3.0%) from two or more races. Hispanic or Latino of any race were 186 persons (34.4%).

The Census reported that 98.2% of the population lived in households and 1.8% lived in non-institutionalized group quarters.

There were 189 households, out of which 67 (35.4%) had children under the age of 18 living in them, 96 (50.8%) were opposite-sex married couples living together, 17 (9.0%) had a female householder with no husband present, 12 (6.3%) had a male householder with no wife present.  There were 11 (5.8%) unmarried opposite-sex partnerships, and 4 (2.1%) same-sex married couples or partnerships. 48 households (25.4%) were made up of individuals, and 17 (9.0%) had someone living alone who was 65 years of age or older. The average household size was 2.81.  There were 125 families (66.1% of all households); the average family size was 3.43.

The population was spread out, with 130 people (24.0%) under the age of 18, 46 people (8.5%) aged 18 to 24, 145 people (26.8%) aged 25 to 44, 155 people (28.7%) aged 45 to 64, and 65 people (12.0%) who were 65 years of age or older.  The median age was 37.8 years. For every 100 females, there were 100.4 males.  For every 100 females age 18 and over, there were 103.5 males.

The homeowner vacancy rate was 1.8%; the rental vacancy rate was 4.7%. 56.4% of the population lived in owner-occupied housing units and 41.8% lived in rental housing units.

References

External links

Census-designated places in Sonoma County, California
Census-designated places in California